The Dignity and Truth Platform Political Party (PPDA), stylized as Platforma DA or YES Platform, is a centre-right, liberal political party in Moldova promoting pro-Europeanism and anti-corruption.

Established as the Force of the People Party in December 2015 during the 2015–2016 protests in Moldova and founded by lawyer and former prosecutor Andrei Năstase, the party calls for far-reaching change in the political establishment. The party became an observer member of the European People's Party in 2017.

History 

On 24 February 2015, an initial group that consisted of 14 people, including journalists, analysts, and social activists, announced the creation of a movement they called the Dignity and Truth Platform. The stated purpose of this movement was to serve as a government watchdog. The Platform has organized meetings in which people have expressed their dissatisfaction with the government. Almost one year after the protests, the leaders of the Platform decided to create a new political party.

Ideology 
The party leadership has expressed opposition to what they characterized as the "oligarchic mafia government" of Vladimir Plahotniuc. They support early elections to form a pro-European Union reformist government and hold a centre-right standpoint against corruption in Moldova.

Leadership 

 President – Dinu Plîngău
 Vice Presidents – Iana Stanțieru, Lilia Tănase and Chiril Moțpan
 Secretary General – Liviu Vovc

Election results

References

External links
Official website 
Feb 24 manifesto 

2015 establishments in Moldova
Liberal parties in Moldova
Political parties established in 2015
Pro-European political parties in Moldova